The 2002–03 NLA season was the 65th regular season of the Nationalliga A, the main professional ice hockey league in Switzerland.

Regular season

Final standings

Scoring leaders

Note: GP = Games played; G = Goals; A = Assists; Pts = Points;  PIM = Penalty Minutes

Playoffs

Quarterfinals

Semifinals

Finals

Scoring leaders

Note: GP = Games played; G = Goals; A = Assists; Pts = Points;  PIM = Penalty Minutes

References 
sehv.ch
hockeystats.ch

External links
hockeyfans.ch
eishockeyforum.ch
spoor.ch

1
Swiss